At the Well in Front of the Gate is a 1952 West German romance film directed by Hans Wolff and starring Sonja Ziemann, Hans Stüwe and Paul Klinger. It was shot in Agfacolor at the Tempelhof Studios in West Berlin and on location around Dinkelsbühl in Bavaria. The film's sets were designed by the art directors Willi A. Herrmann, Heinrich Weidemann and Peter Schlewski.

Synopsis
Inge Bachner has three male suitors interested in her, including the owner of a petrol station and a former RAF pilot.

Cast

References

Bibliography 
 Lutz Peter Koepnick. The Cosmopolitan Screen: German Cinema and the Global Imaginary, 1945 to the Present. University of Michigan Press, 2007.

External links 
 
 Am Brunnen vor dem , a different 1922 film of the same name

1952 films
West German films
German romance films
1950s romance films
1950s German-language films
Films directed by Hans Wolff
1950s German films
Films shot in Bavaria
Films shot at Tempelhof Studios